Garth Rickards (born September 23, 1992) is an American racing driver residing in Mechanicsburg, Pennsylvania.  He is currently studying business management at Shippensburg University of Pennsylvania.

Rickards grew up around racing but began racing himself in 2012-2013 where he completed the Skip Barber Racing School program.  The following year, 2014, Garth partnered up with Team Pelfrey in the F1600 Championship Series for his second season in open wheel racing.  He received Rookie of the Year honors with 1 win and 9 podiums.  Also, Garth was nominated for the Team USA Scholarship because of his performance in the 2014 season, where he placed second in the F1600 Championship Series.

For 2015, Rickards will enter the Mazda Road to Indy in the U.S. F2000 National Championship with Team Pelfrey.

Complete motorsports results

American Open-Wheel racing results
(key) (Races in bold indicate pole position, races in italics indicate fastest race lap)

F1600 Championship Series

U.S. F2000 National Championship

U.S. F2000 National Championship - Winterfest

Atlantic Championship

Indy Lights

References

External links
Official Website

1992 births
Racing drivers from Pennsylvania
People from Mechanicsburg, Pennsylvania
Living people
Atlantic Championship drivers
U.S. F2000 National Championship drivers
Indy Lights drivers
Carlin racing drivers
Team Pelfrey drivers
JDC Motorsports drivers